Lophopleura is a genus of snout moths. It was described by Émile Louis Ragonot in 1891.

Species
Lophopleura eurzonalis Hampson, 1897
Lophopleura sublituralis Warren, 1891
Lophopleura xanthotaenialis Ragonot, 1891

References

Chrysauginae
Pyralidae genera
Taxa named by Émile Louis Ragonot